The 2017 British Columbia general election was held on May 9, 2017, to elect 87 members (MLAs) to the Legislative Assembly to serve in the 41st Parliament of the Canadian province of British Columbia. In the 40th Parliament prior to this general election, the British Columbia Liberal Party formed the government under the leadership of Christy Clark, while the British Columbia New Democratic Party (NDP), under the leadership of Adrian Dix and then John Horgan, formed the Official Opposition; the Green Party of British Columbia were also represented in the legislature with sole MLA and later leader Andrew Weaver.

It was the first election contested on a new electoral map completed in 2015, and the total number of constituencies had increased from 85 to 87. New districts were added in Richmond and Surrey, while the boundaries of 48 existing electoral districts were adjusted.

The election saw no party win a  majority of seats for the first time since the 1952 election: the Liberals won 43 seats, the NDP won 41 seats and the Greens won three seats. After a period of negotiations, the Green Party agreed to provide confidence and supply to an NDP government on May 29. In response, Clark indicated she would remain in office and seek the confidence of the legislature. On June 29, Clark's speech from the throne was voted down, and Lieutenant Governor Judith Guichon invited Horgan to form a government. On July 18, Horgan became the new premier, while Weaver and the other Green MLAs did not join the Cabinet or take any official roles in the new government.

The election was notable in that it marked the end of the Liberal majority government that had led the province since the 2001 election, and the first election in Canada at the federal or provincial level that saw more than one member of a Green party elected.

Timing
Section 23 of British Columbia's Constitution Act provides that general elections occur on the second Tuesday in May of the fourth calendar year after the last election. As an election was held on May 14, 2013, the subsequent election was conducted on May 9, 2017. The same section, though, makes the fixed election date subject to the Lieutenant Governor's right to dissolve the Legislative Assembly as he or she sees fit (in practice, on the advice of the Premier).

The writ was dropped on April 11, 2017. Advance voter registration ended April 11. Advance voting was from April 29 to 30, then began again May 3 and lasted until May 6 before the general election on May 9.

Background

In the 2013 general election, the BC Liberal Party under the leadership of Premier Christy Clark were re-elected with a majority government. The British Columbia New Democratic Party, under the leadership of Adrian Dix, again formed the Official Opposition with a slightly reduced total of 34 seats. Despite the victory, Clark was defeated by NDP candidate David Eby in her riding of Vancouver-Point Grey but was later elected in the Westside-Kelowna riding by-election in July 2013 following Ben Stewart's resignation of his seat the previous month so that she could return to the Legislature. The Green Party, under leader Jane Sterk, won its first seat in the legislature, though Sterk herself was not elected. Dix resigned as NDP leader following the election and was succeeded by Horgan in the NDP 2014 leadership election. On August 13, 2013, Sterk announced she would resign as Green Party leader; Adam Olsen was appointed interim leader on August 25, 2013. The Conservative Party, under the leadership of John Cummins, failed to win a seat and Cummins resigned after the Westside-Kelowna by-election. On February 2, 2016, two by-elections occurred in Vancouver-Mount Pleasant and Coquitlam-Burke Mountain to replace Jenny Kwan and Douglas Horne, who had both resigned to seek election in the 2015 Canadian federal election.

In preparation for the 2017 provincial election, the Electoral Boundaries Commission Amendment Act, 2014 increased the number of electoral districts from 85 to 87 and required that the number of electoral districts in the North, Cariboo-Thompson, and the Columbia-Kootenay regions not be decreased despite their lower populations since the last adjustment of electoral boundaries. The Electoral Districts Act was updated in November 2015 to establish the new electoral districts, adding one new electoral district in Surrey and one in Richmond. Additionally, the boundaries of 48 existing electoral districts were adjusted.

The Election Amendment Act, 2015 required the chief electoral officer to provide each party with a copy of the voters list, allowed constituency associations to incur election expenses, limited vouching to amend voter information to only family members of the voter, and eliminated the 60-day pre-campaign period, including its expense limits.

Election spending and fundraising
According to Elections BC, each candidate's campaign may spend a maximum of $77,674 over the 28 day election period and each political party, in addition, may spend $4,882,405. Also, each third party advertiser may spend up to $3,329 in a single electoral district and up to $166,445 overall.

Unlike the Federal government or most provinces, British Columbia has no limits on political donations. Wealthy individuals, corporations, unions and even foreigners are allowed to donate large amounts to political parties there. On January 13, 2017, the New York Times published a story calling British Columbia the "Wild West" of Canadian political cash.  According to the New York Times, "critics of [Premier Clark] and her party, the conservative British Columbia Liberal Party, say the provincial government has been transformed into a lucrative business, dominated by special interests that trade donations for political favors, undermining Canada's reputation for functional, consensus-driven democracy." The article also explored Premier Clark's practice of taking an additional salary from the BC Liberals, beyond her Premier salary, financed by political contributions. The Globe and Mail also followed up with a special investigation of "British Columbia: The 'wild west' of fundraising". The investigation found that lobbyists are giving tens of thousands of dollars in their own name – and some power brokers are breaking one of the few rules the province has in place.  With no limits on political donations in B.C., the provincial Liberals raised $12.4 million last year – $4.5-million from individuals and $7.9-million from corporations.

On March 5, 2017, Elections BC announced it was launching a probe into Liberal Party fundraising. The Official Opposition, the NDP, has promised to ban corporate and union donation if elected, as well as limits on individual donations, but continues to accept corporate and union donations at the present time.  The Green Party announced in September 2016 that it would no longer accept donations from corporations or unions.

In terms of election spending, British Columbia currently has no spending limits ahead of the election period. During the 2009 election period, there was a spending limit of $4.4 million.  Spending limits for the 2017 election period were adjusted for changes to the consumer price index before being confirmed during the second week in April 2017.

Opinion polls

Endorsements
Green Party
 David Suzuki
Liberal Party
 Globe and Mail
 Vancouver Sun

Retiring incumbents

Liberals
Bill Bennett, Kootenay East
Gordon Hogg, Surrey-White Rock
 Terry Lake, Kamloops-North Thompson
Don McRae, Comox Valley
 Moira Stilwell, Vancouver-Langara
Independent
 Pat Pimm, Peace River North
 Vicki Huntington, Delta South

New Democrats
 Robin Austin, Skeena
 Kathy Corrigan, Burnaby-Deer Lake
 Sue Hammell, Surrey-Green Timbers
 Maurine Karagianis, Esquimalt-Royal Roads
 Norm Macdonald, Columbia River-Revelstoke
 Bill Routley, Cowichan Valley
 Jane Shin, Burnaby-Lougheed

Results

|-
!rowspan="2" colspan="2"|Party
!rowspan="2"|Leader
!rowspan="2"|Candidates
!colspan="5"|Seats
!colspan="3"|Votes
|-
!2013
!Dissol.
!Elected
!%
!Change
!#
!%
!Change
|-

|align=left|Christy Clark
|87 ||49 ||47 ||43 ||49.43||−4||797,194 ||40.37 ||−3.76

|align=left|John Horgan
|87 ||34 ||35 ||41 ||47.13||+6||795,527||40.29 ||+0.56

|align=left|Andrew Weaver
|83 ||1 ||1 ||3 ||3.45||+2||332,331 ||16.83 ||+8.69

|colspan="2" style="text-align:left;"|Independent
|31 ||1 ||2 ||– ||–||−2||20,971||1.06 ||−1.30

|align=left|vacant
|10 ||– ||– ||– ||–||–||10,421||0.53 ||−4.22

|align=left|Clayton Welwood
|30 ||– ||– ||– ||–||–||7,743 ||0.39 ||+0.29

|align=left|Rod Taylor (interim)
|5 ||– ||– ||– ||–||–||3,398 ||0.17 ||+0.12

| colspan="2" style="text-align:left;"|No affiliation
|2 ||– ||– ||– ||–||–||1,151 ||0.06 || −0.31

|align=left|James Filippelli
|10 ||– ||– ||– ||–||–||1,137 ||0.06 ||+0.03

|align=left| vacant
|2 ||– ||– ||– ||–||–||896 ||0.05 ||+0.03

|align=left|Timothy Gidora
|6 ||– ||– ||– ||–||–||802 ||0.04 ||+0.02

|align=left|Robin Richardson
|4 || ||– ||– ||–||–||646 ||0.03 ||

|align=left|Mervyn Ritchie
|1 || ||– ||– ||–||–||580 ||0.03 ||

|align=left|Salvatore Vetro
|1 ||– ||– ||– ||–||–||543 ||0.03 ||−0.04

|align=left|vacant
|3 || ||– ||– ||–||–||463 ||0.02 ||

|align=left|Wei Chen
|1 || ||– ||– ||–||–||318 ||0.02 ||

|align=left|Troy Gibbons
|2 || ||– ||– ||–||–||248 ||0.01 ||

|align=left| vacant
|2 || ||– ||– ||–||–||205 ||0.01 ||

|align=left|Phillip Ryan
|1 || ||– ||– ||–||–||90 ||0.00 ||

|align=left|Erik Deutscher
|1 || ||– ||– ||–||–||58 ||0.00 ||
|-
| style="text-align:left;" colspan="3"|Total
|369 ||85 ||85 ||87 ||100.0||–||1,974,712||100.0||–
|}

Aftermath 
On May 9, it was not immediately clear what form the government would take, as Elections BC does not count absentee ballots until two weeks after election day. This final count would determine the makeup of the legislature, since several seats were won with margins of a few hundred votes or less, and both the Liberals and NDP hoped to acquire enough seats to secure a majority. No seats changed hands, however, after the counting of absentee ballots concluded on May 24, and the initial count of 43–41–3 was confirmed.

As no single party won a majority of seats, the Green Party was approached by both the Liberals and the NDP to determine whether they would support a minority government or a coalition government headed by either party. No grand coalition or agreement between the two large parties, excluding the Greens, was seriously considered. On May 29, Horgan and Weaver announced that the Greens would provide confidence and supply to an NDP minority government, a position which was endorsed the following day by the members of both caucuses. In response, Clark indicated that she would have the legislature sit in the coming weeks and seek its confidence in a Liberal minority government, while acknowledging that she would likely be unsuccessful. On June 12, Clark appointed a new cabinet that saw new MLAs join cabinet and existing ones take on different portfolios; Clark described the cabinet as being in "caretaker mode" and that it wouldn't pursue any new policies, but added "the team reflects the results of listening to what voters told us in the last election." On June 22, the legislature convened with a throne speech that Clark said contained "the best ideas from all parties"; of the 48 pledges within, 30 were absent from the Liberal Party's election platform. On June 29, the Liberals were defeated in a confidence vote; Clark then asked Lieutenant Governor Judith Guichon to dissolve the legislature and call a new election. Guichon refused and instead invited Horgan to form an NDP minority government. Horgan was sworn into office on July 18.

Results by riding
The following tables present detailed results by riding as per Elections BC.
Names in bold are outgoing cabinet ministers, and names in italics are party leaders. The premier is in both.
 denotes incumbent MLAs who did not seek re-election.
 denotes incumbent MLAs who sought re-election in a different riding.
A riding name in brackets below the name of the incumbent MLA indicates the name of the predecessor riding contested in the last election.
Candidate names are given as they appeared on the ballot, and may include formal names and middle names that the candidate does not use in day-to-day political life. For example, Greg Kyllo appeared on the ballot as "Gregory James Kyllo".

Northern British Columbia

|-
| style="background:whitesmoke;"|Nechako Lakes
|| ||John Rustad5,307 – 54.39%
| ||Anne Marie Sam2,909 – 29.81%
| ||Douglas Norman Gook878 – 9.00%
| ||Jon Rempel (Ltn.)438 – 4.49%Al Trampuh (Ind.)226 – 2.32%
|| ||John Rustad
|-
| style="background:whitesmoke;"|North Coast
| ||Herb Pond3,079 – 33.66%
|| ||Jennifer Rice5,243 – 57.31%
| ||Hondo Arendt826 – 9.03%
| ||
|| ||Jennifer Rice
|-
| style="background:whitesmoke;"|Peace River North
|| ||Dan Davies9,707 – 66.31%
| ||Rob Dempsey973 – 6.65%
| ||
| ||Bob Fedderly (Ind.)2,799 – 19.12%Rob Fraser (Ind.)884 – 6.04%Jeff Richert (Ind.)275 – 1.88%
|| ||Pat Pimm
|-
| style="background:whitesmoke;"|Peace River South
|| ||Mike Bernier6,634 – 75.94%
| ||Stephanie Goudie2,102 – 24.06%
| ||
| ||
|| ||Mike Bernier
|-
| style="background:whitesmoke;"|Prince George-Mackenzie
|| ||Mike Morris10,725 – 57.12%
| ||Bobby Deepak5,942 – 31.65%
| ||Hilary Crowley2,109 – 11.23%
| ||
|| ||Mike Morris
|-
| style="background:whitesmoke;"|Prince George-Valemount
|| ||Shirley Bond11,189 – 58.20%
| ||Natalie Fletcher5,683 – 29.56%
| ||Nan Kendy2,353 – 12.24%
| ||
|| ||Shirley Bond
|-
| style="background:whitesmoke;"|Skeena
|| ||Ellis Ross6,772 – 52.23%
| ||Bruce Alan Bidgood5,613 – 43.29%
| ||
| ||Merv Ritchie (LAW)580 – 4.47%
|| ||Robin Austin
|-
| style="background:whitesmoke;"|Stikine
| ||Wanda Good3,531 – 38.75%
|| ||Doug Donaldson4,748 – 52.10%
| ||
| ||Rod Taylor (CHP)834 – 9.15%
|| ||Doug Donaldson
|-

Kootenays

|-
| style="background:whitesmoke;"|Columbia River-Revelstoke
|| ||Doug Clovechok6,620 – 45.44%
| ||Gerry Taft5,248 – 36.02%
| ||Samson Boyer1,708 – 11.72%
| ||Duncan Boyd MacLeod (Ind.)469 – 3.22%Justin James Hooles (Ind.)371 – 2.55%Rylan Kashuba (Ltn.)154 – 1.06%
|| ||Norm Macdonald
|-
| style="background:whitesmoke;"|Kootenay East
|| ||Tom Glenn Shypitka9,666 – 56.57%
| ||Randal Macnair5,069 – 29.67%
| ||Yvonne Marie Prest1,926 – 11.27%
| ||Keith D. Komar (Ltn.)425 – 2.49%
|| ||Bill Bennett
|-
| style="background:whitesmoke;"|Kootenay West
| ||Jim Postnikoff4,547 – 24.33%
|| ||Katrine Conroy11,164 – 59.74%
| ||Sam Troy2,976 – 15.93%
| ||
|| ||Katrine Conroy
|-
| style="background:whitesmoke;"|Nelson-Creston
| ||Tanya Rae Wall5,087 – 27.93%
|| ||Michelle Mungall7,685 – 42.19%
| ||Kim Charlesworth5,130 – 28.16%
| ||Jesse O'Leary (Ind.)164 – 0.90%Tom Prior (Ind.)149 – 0.82%
|| ||Michelle Mungall
|-

Okanagan, Shuswap and Boundary

|-
| style="background:whitesmoke;"|Boundary-Similkameen
|| ||Linda Margaret Larson9,513 – 42.80%
| ||Colleen Ross7,275 – 32.73%
| ||Vonnie Lavers2,274 – 10.23%
| ||Peter Entwistle (Ind.)3,165 – 14.24%
|| ||Linda Larson
|-
| style="background:whitesmoke;"|Kelowna-Lake Country
||  ||Norm Letnick15,286 – 59.75%
| ||Erik Olesen5,345 – 20.89%
| ||Alison Shaw4,951 – 19.35%
| ||
|| ||Norm Letnick
|-
| style="background:whitesmoke;"|Kelowna-Mission
|| ||Steve Thomson15,399 – 57.18%
| ||Harwinder Kaur Sandhu5,720 – 21.24%
| ||Rainer Wilkins3,836 – 14.24%
| ||Charles Hardy (Cons.)1,976 – 7.34%
|| ||Steve Thomson
|-
| style="background:whitesmoke;"|Kelowna West
|| ||Christy Clark15,674 – 59.05%
| ||Shelley Cook6,672 – 25.14%
| ||Robert Mellalieu3,628 – 13.67%
| ||Brian Thiesen (Ind.)570 – 2.15%
|| ||Christy Clark
|-
| style="background:whitesmoke;"|Penticton
|| ||Dan Ashton14,470 – 52.80%
| ||Tarik Sayeed7,874 – 28.73%
| ||Connie Sahlmark5,061 – 18.47%
| ||
|| ||Dan Ashton
|-
| style="background:whitesmoke;"|Shuswap
|| ||Gregory James Kyllo14,829 – 55.80%
| ||Sylvia Jean Lindgren7,161 – 26.95%
| ||Kevin Babcock4,175 – 15.71%
| ||Kyle McCormack (Ltn.)410 – 1.54%
|| ||Greg Kyllo
|-
| style="background:whitesmoke;"|Vernon-Monashee
||  ||Eric Bailey Foster13,625 – 47.87%
| ||Barry Charles Dorval8,355 – 29.36%
| ||Keli Westgate6,139 – 21.57%
| ||Don Jefcoat (Ltn.)341 – 1.20%
|| ||Eric Foster
|-

Thompson and Cariboo

|-
| style="background:whitesmoke;"|Cariboo-Chilcotin
|| ||Donna Barnett8,520 – 58.78%
| ||Sally Watson3,801 – 26.22%
| ||Rita Helen Giesbrecht2,174 – 15.00%
| ||
|| ||Donna Barnett
|-
| style="background:whitesmoke;"|Cariboo North
|| ||Coralee Ella Oakes6,359 – 51.06%
| ||Scott Elliott4,430 – 35.57%
| ||Richard Edward Jaques919 – 7.38%
| ||Tony Goulet (Cons.)747 – 6.00%
|| ||Coralee Oakes
|-
| style="background:whitesmoke;"|Fraser-Nicola
|| ||Jackie L. Tegart6,597 – 41.97%
| ||Harry Lali6,005 – 38.21%
| ||Arthur Alexander Green2,517 – 16.01%
| ||Michael Henshall (Social Credit)598 – 3.80%
|| ||Jackie Tegart
|-
| style="background:whitesmoke;"|Kamloops-North Thompson
|| ||Peter Gordon Milobar12,001 – 48.32%
| ||Barb Nederpel7,538 – 30.35%
| ||Dan Hines5,111 – 20.58%
| ||Peter Paul Kerek (Comm.)187 – 0.75%
|| ||Terry Lake
|-
| style="background:whitesmoke;"|Kamloops-South Thompson
|| ||Todd Graham Stone15,465 – 55.78%
| ||Nancy Bepple6,072 – 21.90%
| ||Donovan Cavers5,785 – 20.86%
| ||Jessica Lea Bradshaw (Ltn.)295 – 1.06%Beat Klossner (Comm.)109 – 0.39%
|| ||Todd Stone
|-

Fraser Valley

|-
| style="background:whitesmoke;"|Abbotsford-Mission
||  ||Simon John Gibson12,879 – 51.19%
| ||Andrew Murray Christie7,339 – 29.17%
| ||Jennifer Holmes4,298 – 17.08%
| ||Dan Cameron (CHP)644 – 2.56%
|| ||Simon Gibson
|-
| style="background:whitesmoke;"|Abbotsford South
||  ||Darryl Plecas11,673 – 52.46%
| ||Jasleen Arora6,297 – 28.30%
| ||William Aird Flavelle3,338 – 15.00%
| ||Ron Gray (CHP)942 – 4.23%
|| ||Darryl Plecas
|-
| style="background:whitesmoke;"|Abbotsford West
||  ||Michael de Jong11,618 – 55.23%
| ||Preet Rai6,474 – 30.77%
| ||Kevin Allan Eastwood2,280 – 10.84%
| ||Lynn Simcox (CHP)516 – 2.45%Dave Sharkey (Ltn.)149 – 0.71%
|| ||Mike de Jong
|-
| style="background:whitesmoke;"|Chilliwack
|| ||John Martin9,180 – 48.15%
| ||Tracey Lorrean O'Hara6,207 – 32.56%
| ||Wayne Froese3,277 – 17.19%
| ||Ryan McKinnon (Ind.)402 – 2.11%
|| ||John Martin
|-
| style="background:whitesmoke;"|Chilliwack-Kent
|| ||Laurie Throness11,814 – 52.75%
| ||Patti MacAhonic7,273 – 32.40%
| ||Josie Bleuer3,335 – 14.86%
| ||
|| ||Laurie Throness(Chilliwack-Hope)
|-
| style="background:whitesmoke;"|Langley
|| ||Mary Polak10,755 – 44.40%
| ||Gail Chaddock-Costello8,384 – 34.61%
| ||Elizabeth Helen Walker3,699 – 15.27%
| ||Justin Greenwood (Cons.)1,221 – 5.04%Robert Kerr Pobran (Ltn.)166 – 0.69%
|| ||Mary Polak
|-
| style="background:whitesmoke;"|Langley East
|| ||Rich Coleman16,348 – 53.45%
| ||Inder Johal8,820 – 28.84%
| ||Bill Masse4,968 – 16.24%
| ||Alex Joehl (Ltn.)448 – 1.46%
|| ||Rich Coleman(Fort Langley-Aldergrove)
|-
| style="background:whitesmoke;"|Maple Ridge-Mission
| ||Marc Dalton10,663 – 40.70%
|| ||Bob D'Eith10,988 – 41.94%
| ||Peter Pak Chiu Tam3,467 – 13.23%
| ||Trevor Hamilton (Cons.)934 – 3.57%Jeff Monds (Ltn.)145 – 0.55%
|| ||Marc Dalton
|-
| style="background:whitesmoke;"|Maple Ridge-Pitt Meadows
| ||Doug Bing10,428 – 38.79%
|| ||Lisa Marie Beare12,045 – 44.80%
| ||Alex Pope3,329 – 12.38%
| ||Gary John O'Driscoll (Cons.)676 – 2.51%Steve Ranta (Ind.)408 – 1.52%
|| ||Doug Bing
|-

Surrey

|-
| style="background:whitesmoke;"|Surrey-Cloverdale
||  ||Marvin Hunt11,918 – 47.57%
| ||Rebecca Smith9,763 – 38.97%
| ||Aleksandra Muniak3,091 – 12.34%
| ||Peter Poelstra (Ltn.)279 – 1.11%
|| ||Stephanie Cadieux
|-
| style="background:whitesmoke;"|Surrey-Fleetwood
| ||Peter Fassbender7,413 – 35.83%
|| ||Jagrup Brar11,085 – 53.58%
| ||Tim Binnema2,190 – 10.59%
| ||
|| ||Peter Fassbender
|-
| style="background:whitesmoke;"|Surrey-Green Timbers
| ||Brenda Joy Locke5,056 – 32.95%
|| ||Rachna Singh8,945 – 58.29%
| ||Saira Aujla1,112 – 7.25%
| ||Vikram Bajwa (NA)163 – 1.06%Kanwaljit Singh Moti (YPP)69 – 0.45%
|| ||Sue Hammell
|-
| style="background:whitesmoke;"|Surrey-Guildford
| ||Amrik Virk7,015 – 37.76%
|| ||Garry Begg9,262 – 49.85%
| ||Jodi Murphy1,840 – 9.90%
| ||Kevin Pielak (CHP)462 – 2.49%
|| ||Amrik Virk (Surrey-Tynehead)
|-
| style="background:whitesmoke;"|Surrey-Newton
| ||Gurminder Singh Parihar5,100 – 29.99%
|| ||Harry Bains9,744 – 57.31%
| ||Richard Krieger1,171 – 6.89%
| ||Balpreet Singh Bal (NA)988 – 5.81%
|| ||Harry Bains
|-
| style="background:whitesmoke;"|Surrey-Panorama
| ||Puneet Sandhar10,064 – 41.86%
|| ||Jinny Sims12,226 – 50.85%
| ||Veronica Laurel Greer1,620 – 6.74%
| ||Liz Galenzoski (Refed)132 – 0.55%
|| ||Marvin Hunt
|-
| style="background:whitesmoke;"|Surrey South
|| ||Stephanie Cadieux13,509 – 50.94%
| ||Jonathan Silveira8,718 – 32.87%
| ||Pascal Tremblay3,141 – 11.84%
| ||Peter Njenga (Ind.)634 – 2.39%Josh Barrett (Ltn.)311 – 1.17%Gary Hee (Ind.)140 – 0.53%Fabiola Cecilia Palomino (YPP)67 – 0.25%
|| ||new district
|-
| style="background:whitesmoke;"|Surrey-Whalley
| ||Sargy Chima5,293 – 30.08%
|| ||Bruce Ralston10,315 – 58.62%
| ||Rita Anne Fromholt1,893 – 10.76%
| ||George Gidora (Comm.)96 – 0.55%
|| ||Bruce Ralston
|-
| style="background:whitesmoke;"|Surrey-White Rock
|| ||Tracy Redies14,101 – 49.87%
| ||Niovi Patsicakis8,648 – 30.59%
| ||Bill Marshall4,574 – 16.18%
| ||Tom Bryant (Ind.)950 – 3.36%
|| ||Gordon Hogg
|-

Richmond and Delta

|-
| style="background:whitesmoke;"|Delta North
| ||Scott Hamilton9,319 – 39.69%
|| ||Ravi Kahlon11,465 – 48.83%
| ||Jacquie Miller2,697 – 11.49%
| ||
|| ||Scott Hamilton
|-
| style="background:whitesmoke;"|Delta South
|| ||Ian Paton11,123 – 44.10%
| ||Bruce Reid5,228 – 20.73%
| ||Larry Colero2,349 – 9.31%
| ||Nicholas Wong (Ind.)6,437 – 25.52%Errol Edmund Sherley (Action)88 – 0.35%
|| ||Vicki Huntington
|-
| style="background:whitesmoke;"|Richmond North Centre
|| ||Teresa Wat7,916 – 52.48%
| ||Lyren Chiu5,135 – 34.04%
| ||Ryan Kemp Marciniw1,579 – 10.47%
| ||Dong Pan (Ind.)336 – 2.23%John Crocock (Action)117 – 0.78%
|| ||Teresa Wat(Richmond Centre)
|-
| style="background:whitesmoke;"|Richmond-Queensborough
|| ||Jas Johal8,218 – 41.43%
| ||Aman Singh8,084 – 40.75%
| ||Michael Wolfe2,524 – 12.72%
| ||Kay Khilvinder Hale (Cons.)694 – 3.50%Lawrence Chen (New Rep.)318 – 1.60%
|| ||Linda Reid(Richmond East)
|-
| style="background:whitesmoke;"|Richmond South Centre
|| ||Linda Reid6,914 – 48.89%
| ||Chak Au5,666 – 40.07%
| ||Greg Powell1,561 – 11.04%
| ||
|| ||new district
|-
| style="background:whitesmoke;"|Richmond-Steveston
|| ||John Yap10,332 – 47.60%
| ||Kelly Greene8,524 – 39.35%
| ||Roy Sakata2,833 – 13.05%
| ||
|| ||John Yap
|-

Burnaby, New Westminster, and Coquitlam

|-
| style="background:whitesmoke;"|Burnaby-Deer Lake
| ||Karen Xiao Bao Wang6,491 – 35.54%
|| ||Anne Kang8,747 – 47.89%
| ||Rick McGowan2,209 – 12.09%
| ||Graham Bowers (Cons.)589 – 3.22%Elias Ishak (Ind.)229 – 1.25%
|| |||Kathy Corrigan
|-
| style="background:whitesmoke;"|Burnaby-Edmonds
| ||Garrison Duke6,404 – 32.09%
|| ||Raj Chouhan10,827 – 54.25%
| ||Valentine Wu2,728 – 13.67%
| ||
|| ||Raj Chouhan
|-
| style="background:whitesmoke;"|Burnaby-Lougheed
| ||Steve Darling8,391 – 36.91%
|| ||Katrina Chen10,911 – 48.06%
| ||Joe Keithley3,127 – 13.77%
| ||Sylvia Gung (Ind.)145 – 0.64%Neeraj Murarka (Ltn.)129 – 0.57%
|| ||Jane Shin
|-
| style="background:whitesmoke;"|Burnaby North
| ||Richard T. Lee9,290 – 39.42%
|| ||Janet Routledge11,447 – 48.57%
| ||Peter Hallschmid2,830 – 12.01%
| ||
|| ||Richard T. Lee
|-
| style="background:whitesmoke;"|Coquitlam-Burke Mountain
|| ||Joan Isaacs10,388 – 44.28%
| ||Jodie Wickens10,301 – 43.91%
| ||Ian Donnelly Soutar2,771 – 11.81%
| ||
|| ||Jodie Wickens
|-
| style="background:whitesmoke;"|Coquitlam-Maillardville
| ||Steve Kim8,519 – 37.70%
|| ||Selina Mae Robinson11,438 – 50.61%
| ||Nicola Eyton Spurling2,467 – 10.92%
| ||Jesse Velay-Vitow (Ltn.)175 – 0.77%
|| ||Selina Robinson
|-
| style="background:whitesmoke;"|New Westminster
| ||Lorraine Brett5,870 – 21.20%
|| ||Judy Darcy14,377 – 51.93%
| ||Jonina Campbell6,939 – 25.07%
| ||James Crosty (Social Credit)298 – 1.08%Rex Brocki (Ltn.)199 – 0.72%
|| ||Judy Darcy
|-
| style="background:whitesmoke;"|Port Coquitlam
| ||Susan Chambers7,582 – 30.05%
|| ||Mike Farnworth14,079 – 55.79%
| ||Jason Hanley3,237 – 12.83%
| ||Lewis Clarke Dahlby (Ltn.)248 – 0.98%Billy Gibbons (Cascadia)88 – 0.35%
|| ||Mike Farnworth
|-
| style="background:whitesmoke;"|Port Moody-Coquitlam
| ||Linda Reimer9,910 – 40.20%
|| ||Rick Glumac11,754 – 47.69%
| ||Don Barthel2,985 – 12.11%
| ||
|| ||Linda Reimer
|-

Vancouver

|-
| style="background:whitesmoke;"|Vancouver-Fairview
| ||Gabe Garfinkel9,436 – 31.85%
|| ||George Heyman16,035 – 54.12%
| ||Louise Boutin4,007 – 13.52%
| ||Joey Doyle (YPP)149 – 0.50%
|| ||George Heyman
|-
| style="background:whitesmoke;"|Vancouver-False Creek
|| ||Sam Sullivan10,370 – 42.16%
| ||Morgane Oger9,955 – 40.47%
| ||Bradley Darren Shende3,880 – 15.77%
| ||Liz Jaluague (Ltn.)213 – 0.87%James Filippelli (YPP)91 – 0.37%Phillip James Ryan (Citizens First)90 – 0.37%
|| ||Sam Sullivan
|-
| style="background:whitesmoke;"|Vancouver-Fraserview
| ||Suzanne Anton9,985 – 42.22%
|| ||George Chow11,487 – 48.57%
| ||Eric Kolotyluk1,826 – 7.72%
| ||Hiroshi Hyde (Ltn.)179 – 0.76%Harpreet S. Bajwa (YPP)174 – 0.74%
|| ||Suzanne Anton
|-
| style="background:whitesmoke;"|Vancouver-Hastings
| ||Jane Spitz5,160 – 21.56%
|| ||Shane Lee Simpson14,351 – 59.96%
| ||David H.T. Wong4,222 – 17.64%
| ||Kimball Mark Cariou (Comm.)203 – 0.85%
|| ||Shane Simpson
|-
| style="background:whitesmoke;"|Vancouver-Kensington
| ||Kim Jee Chan Logan7,236 – 32.16%
|| ||Mable Elmore12,504 – 55.57%
| ||Simon Alexander Rear2,580 – 11.47%
| ||Ramanjit Kaur Dhillon (YPP)181 – 0.80%
|| ||Mable Elmore
|-
| style="background:whitesmoke;"|Vancouver-Kingsway
| ||Trang Nguyen5,377 – 27.09%
|| ||Adrian Dix12,031 – 60.62%
| ||Ellisa Calder1,848 – 9.31%
| ||Charles Bae (Cons.)504 – 2.54%Brette Mullins (YPP)85 – 0.43%
|| ||Adrian Dix
|-
| style="background:whitesmoke;"|Vancouver-Langara
|| ||Michael Lee10,047 – 47.46%
| ||James Wang8,057 – 38.06%
| ||Janet Rhoda Fraser2,894 – 13.67%
| ||Surinder Singh Trehan (YPP)172 – 0.81%
|| ||Moira Stilwell
|-
| style="background:whitesmoke;"|Vancouver-Mount Pleasant
| ||Conny Lin3,917 – 16.03%
|| ||Melanie Mark15,962 – 65.31%
| ||Jerry Kroll4,136 – 16.92%
| ||Mike Hansen (Ind.)212 – 0.87%Peter Marcus (Comm.)142 – 0.58%Shai Joseph Mor (YPP)72 – 0.29%
|| ||Melanie Mark
|-
| style="background:whitesmoke;"|Vancouver-Point Grey
| ||James Lombardi8,414 – 33.16%
|| ||David Robert Patrick Eby14,195 – 55.94%
| ||Amanda Konkin2,604 – 10.26%
| ||Brian Taylor (Ind.)84 – 0.33%David Stall (YPP)77 – 0.30%
|| ||David Eby
|-
| style="background:whitesmoke;"|Vancouver-Quilchena
|| ||Andrew Wilkinson12,464 – 55.96%
| ||Madeline Lalonde6,244 – 28.03%
| ||Michael Barkusky3,301 – 14.82%
| ||William Morrison (Ltn.)265 – 1.19%
|| ||Andrew Wilkinson
|-
| style="background:whitesmoke;"|Vancouver-West End
| ||Nigel Elliott5,064 – 23.01%
|| ||Spencer Chandra Herbert13,420 – 60.97%
| ||James Marshall3,059 – 13.90%
| ||John Clarke (Ltn.)352 – 1.60%Leon David Dunn (Ind.)116 – 0.53%
|| ||Spencer Chandra Herbert
|-

North Shore and Sunshine Coast

|-
| style="background:whitesmoke;"|North Vancouver-Lonsdale
| ||Naomi Yamamoto10,373 – 38.14%
|| ||Bowinn Ma12,361 – 45.45%
| ||Richard Warrington4,148 – 15.25%
| ||Donald N.S. Wilson (Ltn.)316 – 1.16%
|| ||Naomi Yamamoto
|-
| style="background:whitesmoke;"|North Vancouver-Seymour
|| ||Jane Ann Thornthwaite13,194 – 46.36%
| ||Michael Rene Charrois9,808 – 34.47%
| ||Joshua Johnson5,208 – 18.30%
| ||Clayton Welwood (Ltn.)247 – 0.87%
|| ||Jane Thornthwaite
|-
| style="background:whitesmoke;"|Powell River-Sunshine Coast
| ||Mathew Wilson6,602 – 24.53%
|| ||Nicholas Simons13,646 – 50.70%
| ||Kim Darwin6,505 – 24.17%
| ||Reuben Richards (Cascadia)160 – 0.59%
|| ||Nicholas Simons
|-
| style="background:whitesmoke;"|West Vancouver-Capilano
|| ||Ralph Sultan13,596 – 57.14%
| ||Mehdi Russel5,622 – 23.63%
| ||Michael Markwick4,575 – 19.23%
| ||
|| ||Ralph Sultan
|-
| style="background:whitesmoke;"|West Vancouver-Sea to Sky
|| ||Jordan Sturdy10,449 – 43.08%
| ||Michelle Livaja6,532 – 26.93%
| ||Dana Moore Taylor6,947 – 28.64%
| ||Michael Cambridge (Ltn.)186 – 0.77%Tristan Andrew Galbraith (Ind.)143 – 0.59%
|| ||Jordan Sturdy
|-

Vancouver Island

|-
| style="background:whitesmoke;"|Courtenay-Comox
| ||Jim Benninger10,697 – 36.72%
|| ||Ronna-Rae Leonard10,886 – 37.36%
| ||Ernie Sellentin5,351 – 18.37%
| ||Leah Catherine McCulloch (Cons.)2,201 – 7.55%
|| ||Don McRae (Comox Valley)
|-
| style="background:whitesmoke;"|Cowichan Valley
| ||Steve Housser8,400 – 27.41%
| ||Lori Lynn Iannidinardo9,603 – 31.34%
|| ||Sonia Furstenau11,475 – 37.45%
| ||Ian Morrison (Ind.)502 – 1.64%James Robert Anderson (Ltn.)393 – 1.28%Samuel Lockhart (Ind.)145 – 0.47%Eden Haythornthwaite (Ind.)124 – 0.40%
|| ||Bill Routley
|-
| style="background:whitesmoke;"|Mid Island-Pacific Rim
| ||Darren Frank DeLuca6,578 – 25.69%
|| ||Scott Kenneth Fraser12,556 – 49.04%
| ||Alicia La Rue5,206 – 20.33%
| ||Julian Fell (Cons.)878 – 3.43%Robert Alexander Clarke (Ltn.)298 – 1.16%Dan Cebuliak (Refed.)86 – 0.34%
|| ||Scott Fraser(Alberni-Pacific Rim)
|-
| style="background:whitesmoke;"|Nanaimo
| ||Paris Gaudet8,911 – 32.54%
|| ||Leonard Krog12,746 – 46.54%
| ||Kathleen Harris5,454 – 19.91%
| ||Bill Walker (Ltn.)277 – 1.01%
|| ||Leonard Krog
|-
| style="background:whitesmoke;"|Nanaimo-North Cowichan
| ||Alana DeLong7,380 – 28.20%
|| ||Doug Routley12,275 – 46.90%
| ||Lia Marie Constance Versaevel6,244 – 23.86%
| ||P. Anna Paddon (Ind.)274 – 1.05%
|| ||Doug Routley
|-
| style="background:whitesmoke;"|North Island
| ||Dallas William Smith9,148 – 35.47%
|| ||Claire Felicity Trevena12,255 – 47.51%
| ||Sue Moen3,846 – 14.91%
| ||John M. Twigg (BC First)543 – 2.11%
|| ||Claire Trevena
|-
| style="background:whitesmoke;"|Parksville-Qualicum
|| ||Michelle Stilwell14,468 – 45.13%
| ||Sue Powell9,189 – 28.66%
| ||Glenn Sollitt8,157 – 25.44%
| ||Terry Hand (Refed.)245 – 0.76%
|| ||Michelle Stilwell
|-

Greater Victoria

|-
| style="background:whitesmoke;"|Esquimalt-Metchosin
| ||Barb Desjardins7,055 – 27.61%
|| ||Mitzi Jayne Dean11,816 – 46.25%
| ||Andy MacKinnon6,339 – 24.81%
| ||Josh Steffler (Ltn.)171 – 0.67%Delmar Martay (Ind.)102 – 0.40%Tyson Riel Strandlund (Comm.)65 – 0.25%
|| ||Maurine Karagianis(Esquimalt-Royal Roads)
|-
| style="background:whitesmoke;"|Langford-Juan de Fuca
| ||Cathy Noel6,544 – 26.11%
|| ||John Horgan13,224 – 52.75%
| ||Brendan Ralfs4,795 – 19.13%
| ||Scott Burton (Ltn.)262 – 1.05%Willie Nelson (VIP)242 – 0.97%
|| ||John Horgan(Juan de Fuca)
|-
| style="background:whitesmoke;"|Oak Bay-Gordon Head
| ||Alex Dutton6,952 – 23.77%
| ||Bryce Casavant6,912 – 23.63%
|| ||Andrew John Weaver15,257 – 52.17%
| ||Jin Dong Yang-Riley (VIP)67 – 0.23%Xaanja Ganja Free (4BC)58 – 0.20%
|| ||Andrew Weaver
|-
| style="background:whitesmoke;"|Saanich North and the Islands
| ||Stephen P. Roberts9,321 – 26.46%
| ||Gary Holman10,764 – 30.56%
|| ||Adam Olsen14,775 – 41.95%
| ||Jordan Templeman (Ind)364 – 1.03%
|| ||Gary Holman
|-
| style="background:whitesmoke;"|Saanich South
| ||David Calder8,716 – 31.05%
|| ||Lana Popham11,912 – 42.46%
| ||Mark Neufeld7,129 – 25.39%
| ||Andrew Paul McLean (Ltn.)177 – 0.63%Richard Percival Pattee (VIP)130 – 0.46%
|| ||Lana Popham
|-
| style="background:whitesmoke;"|Victoria-Beacon Hill
| ||Karen Bill4,689 – 15.49%
|| ||Carole James16,057 – 53.05%
| ||Kalen Harris9,194 – 30.38%
| ||Art Lowe (Ltn.)190 – 0.63%Jordan Reichert (Ind.)102 – 0.34%David Shebib (Ind.)35 – 0.12%
|| ||Carole James
|-
| style="background:whitesmoke;"|Victoria-Swan Lake
| ||Stacey Piercey4,005 – 15.87%
|| ||Rob Fleming13,531 – 53.62%
| ||Christopher Alan Maxwell7,491 – 29.69%
| ||David Costigane (VIP)207 – 0.82%
|| ||Rob Fleming
|-

Student vote results 
Student votes are mock elections that run parallel to actual elections, in which students not of voting age participate. They are administered by Student Vote Canada. Student vote elections are for educational purposes and do not count towards the results.

! colspan="2"|Party
! Leader
! Seats
! Votes 
! %
|-

|align=left| John Horgan
|60 ||65,205 ||38.98
|-

|align=left|Andrew Weaver
|14 ||47,641 ||28.48
|-

|align=left|Christy Clark
|12 ||42,651 ||25.5
|-

| colspan="2" style="text-align:left;"|Independent
|1 ||3,626 ||2.17
|-
|style="background-color:gainsboro"|
| colspan="2" style="text-align:left;"|Others
|0 ||8,156 ||4.79
|-
| style="text-align:left;" colspan="3"|Total
|87 ||167,576 ||100.0
|}

Footnotes

References

Further reading

External links
 Elections BC
 Legislative Assembly Library Election Weblinks
 Student Vote Results

British Columbia
2017 in British Columbia
2017
May 2017 events in Canada